Never Mind the Quality Feel the Width is a rarely seen 1973 British comedy film directed by Ronnie Baxter and starring John Bluthal, Joe Lynch and Bernard Stone. It was a spin-off from the ITV television series Never Mind the Quality, Feel the Width about two mismatched tailors in the East End of London.

Plot
In the course of the film, Manny and Patrick hire a sexy new assistant Rita, seriously fall out after a gambling incident, experience woman trouble, find themselves burgled, and eventually end up on holiday in Rome after posing as priests. Rita is played by Wendy King

Cast
 John Bluthal as Manny Cohen
 Joe Lynch as Patrick Kelly
 Yootha Joyce as Mrs. Finch
 Wendy King as Rita
 Ann Beach as Bridie
 Eddie Byrne as Father Ignatious
 Bernard Stone as Nathan
 Bill Maynard as Larkin	
 David Nettheim as Rabbi
 Ivor Dean as Bishop Rourke
 David Kelly as Murphy
 Jerold Wells as Tramp
 Vicki Woolf as Maria
 Hilary Farr as Gina (as Hilary Labow)
 Paddy Joyce as Riley
 Steve Plytas as Swiss Guard
 Peter Denyer as Lad

Critical reception
Sky Movies wrote, "although one of the better TV spin-offs, this is not so much a feature film as three episodes strung together by a tenuous overall storyline. Indeed, the episodes, chronicling the abrasive love-hate relationship between two East London tailors - one Irish, the other Jewish - are themselves composed of sketches."

References

External links

1973 films
British comedy films
1973 comedy films
Films shot at Pinewood Studios
Films set in London
Films based on television series
EMI Films films
1970s English-language films
1970s British films